The 50th Yasar Dogu Tournament 2022, was a wrestling event held in Istanbul, Turkey between 24 and 27 February 2022. It was held as the first of the ranking series together with the 2022 Vehbi Emre & Hamit Kaplan Tournament.

The international tournament included competition in both men's and women's freestyle wrestling. The tournament was held in honor of the two time Olympic Champion, Yaşar Doğu.

Competition schedule
All times are (UTC+3)

Medal table

Team ranking

Medal overview

Men's freestyle

Women's freestyle

Results

Men's freestyle

Men's freestyle 57 kg
 Legend
 F — Won by fall
WO — Won by walkover

Top half

Bottom half

Men's freestyle 61 kg
 Legend
 F — Won by fall

Top half

Bottom half

Men's freestyle 65 kg
 Legend
 F — Won by fall
WO — Won by walkover

Top half

Bottom half

Men's freestyle 70 kg
 Legend
 F — Won by fall

Top half

Bottom half

Men's freestyle 74 kg
 Legend
 F — Won by fall

Top half

Bottom half

Men's freestyle 79 kg
 Legend
 F — Won by fall
 R — Retired

Top half

Bottom half

Men's freestyle 86 kg
 Legend
 F — Won by fall
WO — Won by walkover

Top half

Bottom half

Men's freestyle 92 kg
 Legend
 F — Won by fall

Men's freestyle 97 kg
 Legend
 F — Won by fall

Men's freestyle 125 kg
 Legend
 F — Won by fall

Top half

Bottom half

Women's freestyle

Women's freestyle 50 kg
 Legend
 F — Won by fall

Top half

Bottom half

Women's freestyle 53 kg
 Legend
 F — Won by fall

Top half

Bottom half

Women's freestyle 55 kg
 Legend
 F — Won by fall

Women's freestyle 57 kg
 Legend
 F — Won by fall

Top half

Bottom half

Women's freestyle 59 kg
 Legend
 F — Won by fall

Women's freestyle 62 kg
 Legend
 F — Won by fall

Top half

Bottom half

Women's freestyle 65 kg
 Legend
 F — Won by fall

Top half

Bottom half

Women's freestyle 68 kg
 Legend
 F — Won by fall

Women's freestyle 72 kg
 Legend
 F — Won by fall

Women's freestyle 76 kg
 Legend
 F — Won by fall

Top half

Bottom half

Participating nations

364 competitors from 38 nations participated.
 (1)
 (2)
 (12)
 (3)
 (6)
 (6)
 (1)
 (1)
 (1)
 (2)
 (5)
 (10)
 (9)
 (2)
 (24)
 (13)
 (1)
 (1)
 (52)
 (13)
 (2)
 (2)
 (4)
 (2)
 (15)
 (2)
 (10)
 (1)
 (9)
 (37)
 (2)
 (4)
 (1)
 (2)
 (3)
 (58)
 (28)
 (17)

Ranking Series
Ranking Series Calendar 2022:
 1st Ranking Series: 24-27 February, Turkey, Istanbul ⇒ 2022 Yasar Dogu Tournament2022 Vehbi Emre & Hamit Kaplan Tournament
 2nd Ranking Series: 2-5 June, Kazakhstan, Almaty ⇒ 2022 Bolat Turlykhanov Cup
 3rd Ranking Series: 22-25 June, Italy, Rome ⇒ Matteo Pellicone Ranking Series 2022
 4th Ranking Series: 14-17 July, Tunisia, Tunis ⇒ 2022 Tunis Ranking Series

References 

Yasar Dogu
Yasar Dogu Tournament
Sports competitions in Istanbul
Yasar Dogu Tournament
2022 Yasar Dogu Tournament
International wrestling competitions hosted by Turkey